Dickson Choto  (born 19 March 1981) is a Zimbabwean footballer who played for Legia Warsaw until June 2013. He was born in Wedza District.

International
He appeared for Zimbabwe in the 2004 African Cup of Nations, since he was not called up for 2006 African Cup of Nations.

Honours
Polish championship (Ekstraklasa):
 Winner (2): 2006, 2013
 Runner-up (3): 2004, 2008, 2009
Polish Cup:
 Winner (4): 2008, 2011, 2012, 2013
Polish Super Cup:
 Winner (1): 2008
 Runner-up (2): 2006, 2012

References

External links
 
 Dickson Choto at football-lineups.com

1981 births
Living people
People from Wedza District
Zimbabwean footballers
Zimbabwe international footballers
Górnik Zabrze players
Pogoń Szczecin players
Legia Warsaw players
Expatriate footballers in Poland
Ekstraklasa players
Zimbabwean expatriate sportspeople in Poland
Zimbabwean expatriate footballers
2004 African Cup of Nations players
Association football defenders
Sportspeople from Mashonaland East Province